Acrocercops lithochalca is a moth of the family Gracillariidae, known from Sikkim, India. It was described by Edward Meyrick in 1930.

References

lithochalca
Moths of Asia
Moths described in 1930